The Association of Proletarian-Revolutionary Authors (German: Bund proletarisch-revolutionärer Schriftsteller) was a German cultural organisation established in 1928, at the time of the Weimar Republic. It was close to the Communist Party of Germany and published a magazine called Die Linkskurve.

Its members were divided into two groups: the so-called "bourgeois  writers" and the so-called '"proletarian writers". The confrontation between the two groups led to a fierce struggle for power within the association, but also to a lively and fruitful cultural debate about the role and form of literature, in the attempt to overcome the 19th century bourgeois models and create a new "revolutionary" model. Important intellectuals of the time took part in the debate, such as Gyorgy Lukács, who was later to contribute to the development of Socialist realism.

The last issue of Die Linkskurve appeared in January 1933. After the Nazis took over power, the association still existed for some time, also in Prague, Paris, Wien, and Switzerland.

Prominent members 
Erich Arendt
Theodor Balk
Johannes R. Becher
Hertha Block
Herbert Bochow
Julian Borchardt (founding member)
Willi Bredel
Elfriede Brüning
Albert Daudistel (excluded 20 May 1930)
Andor Gábor
Karl Grünberg
Willy Harzheim
Kurt Kläber
Egon Erwin Kisch (founding member)
Jan Koplowitz
Berta Lask (founding member)
Maria Leitner
Hans Lorbeer (founding member)
Hans Marchwitza
Klaus Neukrantz
Ernst Ottwalt
Erwin Piscator
Paul Polte alias Peter Polter
Ludwig Renn (founding member)
Trude Richter
Frida Rubiner
Hans Schwalm
Anna Seghers (founding member)
Alexander Graf Stenbock-Fermor
Bernhard and Charlotte Temming
Berta Waterstradt
Erich Weinert (founding member)
Franz Carl Weiskopf
Helmut Weiß alias Hans Wendt (Bremen)
Karl August Wittfogel
Friedrich Wolf
Carl Wüsthoff
Max Zimmering
Hermynia Zur Mühlen

See also 
Russian Association of Proletarian Writers 
Union of Soviet Writers
League of American Writers
Chinese Writers Association

Cultural organisations based in Germany
Arts organizations established in 1928
1928 establishments in Germany
Communist Party of Germany